Ethmia chalcodora is a moth in the family Depressariidae. It is found in northern Argentina and Paraguay.

The ground color of the forewings is white, with dark brown markings, reflecting metallic steel-blue. The ground color of the hindwings is white, but brown at the apex. Adults have been recorded in October.

References

Moths described in 1912
chalcodora